Garra nujiangensis is a species of cyprinid fish in the genus Garra from Yunnan province, China.

References 

Garra
Fish described in 2009